Peren (Pron:/ˈpɛɹən/) is a small town in the Indian state of Nagaland. It is the district headquarters of the Peren District. Zeme Nagas are the main inhabitants of Peren.

External links 
 

Cities and towns in Peren district